Park Chae-lin (born 17 December 1998) is a South Korean ice hockey player. She competed in the 2018 Winter Olympics.

References

1998 births
Living people
Ice hockey players at the 2018 Winter Olympics
South Korean women's ice hockey defencemen
Olympic ice hockey players of South Korea
Winter Olympics competitors for Korea
Ice hockey players at the 2017 Asian Winter Games